Royal and Select Masters may refer to

 Cryptic Masonry, an element of the York Rite system of degrees in Freemasonry
 Order of Royal and Select Masters, a stand-alone organisation in Freemasonry